Park Avenue is a private housing estate in Tai Kok Tsui, Kowloon, Hong Kong. It was one of the projects connected with the MTR Olympic station Phase II development and is built on the reclaimed land of the former Yau Ma Tei Typhoon Shelter. Developed by the consortium of MTR Corporation, Sino Land, Kerry Properties, Bank of China (Hong Kong) and China Overseas Land and Investment in 2001, it comprises five high-rise buildings (Block 6, 7, 8, 9, 10) with a total of 1,592 units.

See also 
Central Park (Hong Kong)

References

Private housing estates in Hong Kong
Olympian City
Sino Group
Kerry Properties
Bank of China
MTR Corporation
Residential buildings completed in 2001